The 2016–17 Ekstraklasa season was Lechia's 73rd since their creation, and was their 9th continuous season in the top league of Polish football.

The season covers the period from 1 July 2016 to 30 June 2017.

Players

First team squad

Transfers

Players In

Players Out

Friendlies

Summer

Winter

Ekstraklasa

Regular season

Matches

League table

Championship round

Matches

League table

Polish Cup

Stats

Goalscorers

References

Lechia Gdańsk seasons
Lechia Gdańsk